John F. Kennedy Catholic Preparatory School is an American Roman Catholic, co-educational high school located in Somers, New York. It serves 630 students in grades 9–12 from Westchester, Dutchess, Putnam and Fairfield counties and the Bronx.  

Known as John F. Kennedy Catholic High School since its inception in 1966, it changed its name to John F. Kennedy Catholic Preparatory School in October 2020.

History 
The school was opened as St. Mary's High School in 1928. and had its last graduating class in June 1966.

In September 1966, the school was reopened as John F. Kennedy Catholic High School. The school was dedicated in May 1967, 

In the spring of 2020, the school changed to its current name.

Student body
In 2014, approximately nine percent of the student body was from China.

Athletics
Kennedy Catholic fields Catholic High School Athletic Association league teams in 13 sports:

Baseball
Basketball
Cross Country
Field Hockey
Football
Golf
Lacrosse
Soccer
Softball
Tennis
Track and Field
Volleyball
Winter Track

The volleyball team was the 2013, 2014, and 2017  CHSAA Class AA champions.

Notable alumni
 Eileen Dickinson – member,  Vermont House of Representatives
 Bernadette Meehan – chief international officer, Obama Foundation
 Edwin Frederick O'Brien – archbishop and cardinal, Catholic Church (as St. Mary's high school)
 Steven Santini – professional hockey player

References

External links
 , The school's official website

1966 establishments in New York (state)
Catholic secondary schools in New York (state)
Educational institutions established in 1966
Private high schools in Westchester County, New York
Somers, New York